Leenaun, also Leenane, is a village and 1,845 acre townland in County Galway, Ireland, on the southern shore of Killary Harbour and the northern edge of Connemara.

Location
Leenaun is situated on the junction of the N59 road, and the R336 road in Connemara.

Leenaun lies where the deep u-shaped Maam Valley, bounded by the Devilsmother to the east, and the massif of Leenaun Hill to the west, meets Killary Harbour, Ireland's deepest fjord.  Across the fjord from the village, is the massif of Ben Gorm, with the larger massif of Mweelrea behind it; while to the east, lie the scenic Aasleagh Falls.  The village is on the route of the Western Way long-distance trail and the Wild Atlantic Way.

Bridge loss and replacement
On 18 July 2007, following heavy rain, the only river bridge in the village was swept away, cutting the town in half, and altering some local routes by over 100-kilometres.; the bridge had stood for over 182 years. A permanent replacement bridge was constructed in 2009, with increased traffic capacity.

Local amenities
In the village are two pubs, a hotel with seaweed baths and two guesthouses, one of which is a former convent of the Sisters of Mercy, with a breakfast room in the former chapel. There is also a café-restaurant and a sheep and wool museum with a shop and its own café, and a post office and shop, as well as a community centre.

Within Maam Valley are some ancient woods, and across the fjord is Delphi (the valley of the Bundorragha River is sometimes called the Delphi Valley) in County Mayo, which has a postal address of "Leenane, Co. Galway," and which contains both a fishing lodge and a resort hotel and adventure sports centre.  Both nearby, on the Erris River which runs into the fjord, and across at Delphi, with a river and two lakes, are active fisheries.

The major tourist attraction of Kylemore Abbey lies to the south and the scenic Renvyle-peninsula lies to the south-west.

In the media
Leenaun was the setting for the 1990 film The Field, and of Martin McDonagh's plays The Beauty Queen of Leenane and The Lonesome West.

Gallery

See also

 Connemara
 List of towns and villages in Ireland
 Mac ind Óclaich

References

Towns and villages in County Galway
Townlands of County Galway